Jayashree Banerjee (born 2 July 1938) is a leader of Bharatiya Janata Party from Madhya Pradesh, and a former member of parliament.

She contested Madhya Pradesh Vidhan Sabha election in 1972 as a member of Jana Sangh from Jabalpur Cantonment seat but lost. She was elected to Madhya Pradesh Legislative Assembly in 1977 (Jabalpur Central, Janata Party member, pre-BJP days), 1990 and 1993 from Pashchim Jabalpur. She served as cabinet minister in Madhya Pradesh government from 1977 to 1980. She was a member of 13th Lok Sabha (1999-2004), elected from Jabalpur.

She is the mother-in-law of the current BJP President Jagat Prakash Nadda.

References

1938 births
State cabinet ministers of Madhya Pradesh
Bharatiya Jana Sangh politicians
Madhya Pradesh MLAs 1977–1980
People from Jabalpur
Living people
Lok Sabha members from Madhya Pradesh
India MPs 1999–2004
Women members of the Madhya Pradesh Legislative Assembly
Bharatiya Janata Party politicians from Madhya Pradesh
20th-century Indian women politicians
20th-century Indian politicians
21st-century Indian women politicians
21st-century Indian politicians
Women state cabinet ministers of India
Madhya Pradesh MLAs 1990–1992
Madhya Pradesh MLAs 1993–1998